Iva Obradović (born 6 May 1984 in Novi Sad, SR Serbia, Yugoslavia) is a rower from Serbia.

She won the silver medal in the women's double scull event at the 2011 European Rowing Championships in Plovdiv, Bulgaria.

Obradović participated at the 2008 Summer Olympics and finished fifth in the B final of the single scull.

References

Iva Obradović biography and Olympic results at Sports-reference.com
Biography

1984 births
Living people
Serbian female rowers
Olympic rowers of Serbia
Rowers at the 2008 Summer Olympics
Sportspeople from Novi Sad
Mediterranean Games gold medalists for Serbia
Competitors at the 2013 Mediterranean Games
Mediterranean Games medalists in rowing
European Rowing Championships medalists